Sospel (Mentonasc: Sospèl) is a commune (municipality) and former schismatic episcopal seat (1381-1418) in the Alpes-Maritimes department in southeastern France near the Italian border and not far from Monte Carlo. And from 1912 to 1932 Sospel even had a tramway system from Mentonwhich had a length of 17,279 km

History and remains 

The town dates back to the 5th century, when it served as an important staging post on the royal road from Nice to Turin. Its main monument is the former cathedral.
 The old toll bridge used by travellers to cross the Bévéra, built in the 13th century, still stands. It was bombed by the Germans during World War II to prevent contact between the French Resistance ("The Maquis") and the Italians. Much of the town was destroyed. Renovated after World War II it now houses the tourist office.
 The ruins of a tower, part of a château (residential castle) belonging to the counts of Provence, are all that remain of the 14th century city walls.

Ecclesiastical history 
During the Western Schism, the Diocese of Ventimiglia (Vintimille in French) was split : the canonical bishop, still residing in Ventimiglia, obedient to the Pope in Rome, controlled the territories dependent of the Italian dogal Republic of Genoa, but an uncanonical line of rival anti-bishops (1381-1418), obedient to the Antipope of Avignon, established their schismatical see 'of Ventimiglia' in Sospel(lo), with sway over the diocese's 'French' territories dependent on the County of Savoy and the lordship of Tende.

Suffragan anti-bishops of (Ventimiglia at) Sospel(lo)
 Bertrando Imberti, Friars Minor (O.F.M. (2 December 1381 – death 1386)
 Pietro Marinaco, O.F.M. (27 August 1392 – 4 September 1409), next Bishop of Famagosta (on Cyprus, now a titular see as Famagusta)
 Bartolomeo de Giudici (22 June 1408 – deposed 1412 - death 1418)

After Ventimiglia's diocesan authority was restored in 1412 as the jurisdiction now known as the  Diocese of Ventimiglia-San Remo, Sospel was assigned to what is now the Diocese of Nice, France, and its former cathedral was demoted to simple church.

 Population 

 Climate 

Under the Köppen system, Sospel features an oceanic climate (Cfb) with warm-summer mediterranean climate (Csb) influences. Influenced by its low altitude, Sospel experiences light frosts in winter and cool nights during the summer.

 Sospel in fiction 
 The town of Sospel is mentioned in Daphne du Maurier's novel Rebecca, when Max de Winter declines an invitation from annoying social climber Mrs. Van Hopper on the excuse that he is driving to Sospel that day.
 In 1909 it was described in Gaston Leroux's novel, The Perfume of the Lady in Black (p. 151), as
 "a picturesque little city lost between the last counterforces of the Alps, two hours and half from Mentone by coach... It is one of the most retired and quietest corners of France, the most dreaded by revenue officers and by the Alpine hunters. But the road which leads to it is one of the most beautiful in the world."
 Sospel is a setting in the 1977 mystery novel All Roads to Sospel'' by George Bellairs.

See also 
 List of Catholic dioceses in France
 List of medieval bridges in France
 Communes of the Alpes-Maritimes department

References

Sources and external links 

 GCatholic - former (anti-)bishopric
 GCatholic, with Google satellite photo-map - St.Michael's church, the former Sospel cathedral

Communes of Alpes-Maritimes
French Riviera
Monte Carlo Rally
Alpes-Maritimes communes articles needing translation from French Wikipedia